The 1893 Guilford Quakers football team represented Guilford College as an independent during the 1893 college football season.

Schedule

References

Guilford
Guilford Quakers football seasons
Guilford Quakers football